Polo is a brand of breath mint whose defining feature is the hole in the middle. The peppermint flavoured Polo was first manufactured in the United Kingdom in 1948, by employee John Bargewell at the Rowntree's Factory, York, and a range of flavours followed. The name may derive from "polar", referencing the cool, fresh taste of the mint. Polo mints are also sold in other countries such as India and Sri Lanka by Nestlé. Polo mints are usually sold in a 34g pack containing 23 individual mints.

History 
Polo mints were developed by Rowntree's in 1939, after manufacturing Life Savers during World War 2 under licence. but their introduction to the market was delayed until 1947, by the onset of the Second World War. Polo fruits followed soon afterward. Company legend is that the name is derived from 'polar' and its implied cool freshness.

Varieties 
Over the years Rowntree and Nestlé have come up with variations of the original Polo mint. Some of these have been successes, whereas others have failed. None has been as successful as the original Polo mint.
 Spearmint: "Cool look, cool taste." These Polos have a strong spearmint flavour and aroma. The original design of the sweets had turquoise flecks on them, and were mildly triboluminescent, but now are white.
 Fruit: These are boiled sweets in several fruit flavours, all in one tube. Flavours include strawberry, blackcurrant, orange, lemon, and lime.
 Polo Gummies: Fruit flavoured soft gummy sweets in the Polo shape.
 Sugar free: Sugar free version of the original Polo containing sorbitol.
 Mini Polos: Small Polos (about 0.5 cm in diameter) with a strong "Super Mint" minty flavour. They were packaged in a box shaped like a Polo Mint. They were also available in an Orange flavour.
 Smoothies: These creamy sweets came in flavours such as blackcurrant, sunshine fruits and strawberry.
 Citrus Sharp: Lemon and lime flavoured. Discontinued in the United Kingdom.
 Butter Mint Polos: mint flavour butterscotch.
 Strong/Extra Strong: "We like them strong, but silent." A rival for Trebor, these were very hot. Discontinued in the United Kingdom.
 Ice: These came in a shiny blue wrapper, and had a cooler mint taste.
 Paan flavoured currently available in India since 2020
 Mint O Fruit: (available in Indonesia). These come in the following flavours: Raspberry Mint, Blackcurrant Mint, Peppermint, Lime Mint and Cherry Mint. These polos come with the following slogan "Think Plong! Masih Ada Bolong!" These are also sold in the United Kingdom in some Poundland stores.
 Holes: These were a plastic tube of small mints approximately, but not exactly, the size of the hole in a standard Polo mint.

Before this, Rowntree had already experimented with different Polos in the 1980s. Polo Fruits were always available, but they briefly made:
 Lemon: Similar to the citrus flavour that Nestlé put out around ten years later, but not identical.
 Orange: similar to Lemon, but in an orange packet.
 Tropical Fruit: included Banana, Melon, Coconut  and others
 Globes : small capsules filled with mint flavoured liquid in a small box with a flip lid

Description 
The original Polo is white in colour with a hole in the middle, and the word 'POLO' embossed twice on the upper flat side of the ring, hence the popular slogan The Mint with the Hole.

Ingredients of the main variety include sugar, glucose syrup, modified starch, stearic acid (of vegetable origin), and mint oils.

Packaging 

Polos are usually sold in individual packs of 23 mints, which measure about 10 cm tall. The tube of Polos is tightly wrapped with aluminium foil backed paper. A green and blue paper wrapper, with the word 'POLO', binds the foil wrapper, with the Os in 'Polo' represented by images of the sweet. For the spearmint flavour, the paper wrapper is turquoise in colour, and the Extra Strong flavour is in a black paper wrapper.

Trademarks 
When the Trade Marks Act 1994 was introduced in the United Kingdom, Nestlé applied to register the shape of the Polo mint. The application featured a white, annular mint without any lettering. This application however was opposed by Kraft Foods, the then owner of Life Savers, and Mars UK, because of the lack of distinctive character of the mint in question.

Nestlé's application was allowed to proceed if it agreed to narrow the description of the mint i.e. the dimensions of the mint were limited to the standard dimensions of the Polo mint and that it was limited to "mint flavoured compressed confectionery".

Kraft Foods made a similar applications for annular sweets eg bearing the mark LIFESAVERS. Nestlé has tried to oppose this trademark application but failed as the court ruled that customers would be able to distinguish between a Polo and a Lifesaver as both have their marks boldly and prominently embossed on the mint.

Advertising 
During the 1980s, Peter Sallis provided the voiceover for television advertisements. With the launch of the spearmint variety, a new television campaign featured a voiceover by Danny John-Jules, using a voice similar to the one he employed as the Cat on Red Dwarf.

In 1995, the company launched a major advertising campaign produced by Aardman Animations, which showed animated Polos on a factory production line. In one, a scared Polo without a hole attempts to escape, but is restrained by the hole punching machinery. Polo experimented with other forms of advertising in the end of the 1990s. In 1998, they collaborated with PolyGram for a compilation album, Cool Grooves, which reached No. 12 in the UK Compilation Chart on 5 September that year.

See also 
 List of breath mints

References

External links 
 

Rowntree's brands
Brand name confectionery
Yorkshire cuisine
Breath mints
British confectionery
Nestlé brands